Urbo Vaarmann (born 6 January 1977 in Rakvere) is an Estonian politician. He was a member of XII Riigikogu.

He has been a member of Estonian Centre Party.

References

Living people
1977 births
Estonian Centre Party politicians
Members of the Riigikogu, 2011–2015
Tallinn University of Technology alumni
People from Rakvere